Marcus Egnatius Marcellinus was a senator of Imperial Rome.

Life
He was consul suffectus in the nundinium of April to June 116 as the colleague of Tiberius Julius Secundus. 

Marcellinus is the earliest member of the Egnatii to have achieved the rank of consul. This gens was of Samnite origin, and their ancestral city was Teanum. His relatives are thought to include Marcus Egnatius Postumus and Aulus Egnatius Priscillianus.

References 

2nd-century Romans
Marcellinus, Marcus
Suffect consuls of Imperial Rome